Bjeliši is a village in the municipality of Bar, Montenegro..

Demographics
According to the 2011 census, its population was 1712.

References

Populated places in Bar Municipality